Eutropis lankae is a species of skink found in Sri Lanka.

References

Eutropis
Reptiles described in 1953
Reptiles of Sri Lanka
Endemic fauna of Sri Lanka